The Indian Armed Forces is the overall unified military of the Republic of India encompassing the Indian Army, the Indian Air Force and the Indian Navy. The President of India serves as the commander-in-chief of the armed forces. With an estimated total active force of 1,325,000 personnel,  maintains the world's second largest armed forces.

Army operations
This includes a list of Army operations, both old one as well as ongoing operations, as well as humanitarian military operations:

Old operations 

-

Ongoing operations

Navy operations
 Operation Vijay (1961) - Annexation of Goa
 Operation Trident (1971) - an offensive operation launched on Pakistan's port city of Karachi during the Indo-Pakistani War of 1971. 
 Operation Python (1971) - Follow-up to Operation Trident on Karachi, Pakistan's port city in 1971.
 Operation Cactus (1988) -  Against the coup to overthrow the Government of Maldives.
 During Operation Restore Hope (1992–2003) -
 Operation Talwar (1999) - Blockage of Karachi Port
 Operation Parakram (2001)
 During Operation Enduring Freedom (2001)
 During 2004 Indian Ocean earthquake (Operation Madath, Operation Sea Waves, Operation Castor, Operation Rainbow, Operation Gambhir & Operation Rahat-II)
 Operation Sukoon (2006) - a relief operation to evacuate Indian, Sri Lankan and Nepalese nationals, as well as Lebanese nationals with Indian spouses, from the conflict zone during the 2006 Lebanon War
 Operation Searchlight (2014) -The Search Operation Undertaken by Indian Navy to find the missing Boeing 777 M.H 17 Malaysian Flight
 Operation Raahat (2015) - Operation by the Indian Armed Forces to evacuate Indian citizens and other foreign nationals from Yemen during the 2015 military intervention by Saudi Arabia and its allies in that country during the Yemeni Crisis.
 Operation Nistar(India) (2018) - Operation by the Indian Navy using INS Sunayna to evacuate Indian citizens from Yemen Island of Socotra who were stranded by Cyclone Mekenu.
 Operation Madad (2018) - Indian Navy had launched Operation Madad, major rescue, and relief operation in flood-hit Kerala. The operation was launched to assist state administration and undertake disaster relief operations due to flooding in many parts of Kerala.
 Operation Samudra Setu (2020) - This operation was launched to bring back Indian citizens struck at overseas during Covid-19 pandemic.

Air Operations
 During World War II (1939–1945) (Main article- India during World War 2)
 During First Kashmir War (1947)
 During Congo Crisis (1961)
 During Sino-Indian War (1962)
 During Second Kashmir War (1965)
 During Bangladesh Liberation War (Operation Meghna Heli Bridge) (1971)
 Meghna Heli Bridge (1971)
 Tangail Airdrop (1971)
 Operation Meghdoot (1984)
 Operation Poomalai (1987)
 Operation Cactus (1988)
 Operation Safed Sagar (1999)
 Atlantique incident (1999)
 Operation Rahat (2013) in Uttarakhand floods
 Operation Maitri (2015) Indian Military's rescue and relief mission in quake-hit Nepal
 Operation Sankat Mochan (India) (2016) An operation of the Indian Air Force in view of 2016 Juba Clashes to evacuate Indian Citizens and other foreign nationals from South Sudan during the South Sudanese Civil War.
Operation Insaniyat (2017) a humanitarian assistance aimed to supply relief packages to Bangladesh for migrant Rohingya Muslims.
Operation Bandar (2019) Operation launched by IAF to bomb the biggest Jaish-e-Mohammed terror camp in Balakot to avenge the Pulwama terror attack. In this operation almost 170-200 terrorists were killed and 45 terrorists were severely injured.
Operation Ganga (2022) An operation by Government of India to evacuate the Indian citizens (mainly students) from Ukraine amidst the 2022 Russian invasion of Ukraine with the help of Indian Air Force and few private airlines.
Operation Dost (2023) Turkey and Syria earthquake.

See also
 Indian Army
 Indian Navy
 Indian Air Force
 Indian Armed Forces

References

 
Operations